Winter Soldier or Winter Soldiers may refer to:
 Winter Soldier Investigation, a 1971 inquiry into American war crimes during the Vietnam War
 Winter Soldier a 1972 documentary film chronicling the 1971 Winter Soldier Investigation
 Winter Soldier: Iraq & Afghanistan, a 2008 inquiry into American war crimes during the wars in Iraq and Afghanistan
 Winter Soldier (comics) or Bucky Barnes, a Marvel Comics superhero
 Captain America: The Winter Soldier, a 2014 superhero film based on the Marvel Comics characters
 The Falcon and the Winter Soldier, a 2021 superhero television series based on Marvel Comics characters
 The Winter Soldier (novel), a novel by Daniel Mason
 Winter Soldiers, a 1943 play by Daniel Lewis James